These were the rosters of the 10 teams competing at the 2013 FIBA Americas Championship.

Group A

Brazil

|}
| valign="top" |
 Head coach

 Assistant coach(es)

Legend
Club – describes lastclub before the tournament
Age – describes ageon 30 August 2013
|}

Canada

|}
| valign="top" |
 Head coach
 

 Assistant coach(es)
 
 
 

Legend
Club – describes lastclub before the tournament
Age – describes ageon 30 August 2013
|}

Jamaica

|}
| valign="top" |
Head coach

Legend
Club – describes lastclub before the tournament
Age – describes ageon 30 August 2013
|}

Puerto Rico

|}
| valign="top" |
Head coach

Assistant coach

Legend
Club – describes lastclub before the tournament
Age – describes ageon 30 August 2013
|}

Uruguay

|}
| valign="top" |
Head coach

Assistant coach(es)

Legend
Club – describes lastclub before the tournament
Age – describes ageon 30 August 2013
|}

Group B

Argentina

The roster was announced on 21 August.

|}
| valign="top" |
 Head coach
 Julio Lamas
 Assistant coach(es)
 Nicolas Casalánguida
 Gonzalo García

Legend
Club – describes lastclub before the tournament
Age – describes ageon 30 August 2013
|}

Dominican Republic

|}
| valign="top" |
Head coach

 Assistant coach(es)
 
 
 

Legend
Club – describes lastclub before the tournament
Age – describes ageon 30 August 2013
|}

Mexico

|}
| valign="top" |
Head coach

Assistant coach

Legend
Club – describes lastclub before the tournament
Age – describes ageon 30 August 2013
|}

Paraguay

|}
| valign="top" |
Head coach

Assistant coach

Legend
Club – describes lastclub before the tournament
Age – describes ageon 30 August 2013
|}

Venezuela

|}
| valign="top" |
Head coach

Assistant coach

Legend
Club – describes lastclub before the tournament
Age – describes ageon 30 August 2013
|}

References

External links
Official website

2013
squads